Oren Amiel (born December 19, 1971), is an Israeli professional basketball coach and former player who is serving as the head coach for Brose Bamberg of the German Basketball Bundesliga.

Professional career

Hapoel Galil Elyon (1994–1999) 
Amiel played point guard for Hapoel Galil Elyon from 1994 to 1999.

Coaching career

Early positions (2004–2017)
Amiel began his coaching career in 2004 as an assistant coach for Oded Kattash at Hapoel Galil Elyon. He held subsequent assistant positions at Maccabi Tel Aviv and Nymburk as well as head coaching positions in the lower Leumit League between 2007 and 2017.

Nymburk (2017–2021)
In 2017, Amiel was named head coach at Nymburk when Ronen Ginzburg resigned to take over the Czech national team full time.

In his 4 seasons at Nymburk, Amiel's teams won the Czech League championship each year in addition to winning 3 Czech Cups, and he was named the Basketball Champions League Coach of the Year after the 2019–2020 season.

Hapoel Jerusalem (2021)
On June 24, 2021, Hapoel Jerusalem announced that Amiel had signed a two-year contract to become their new head coach.

On October 28, 2021, Jerusalem fired Amiel in the wake of the team's 0–3 start in the Champions League and named Yotam Halperin as their new interim head coach.

Brose Bamberg (2021–present)
On November 29, 2021, he has signed with Brose Bamberg of the German Basketball Bundesliga.

References

See also

 Sports in Israel

1971 births
Living people
Basketball Nymburk coaches
Brose Baskets coaches
Hapoel Galil Elyon players
Hapoel Jerusalem B.C. coaches
Israeli basketball coaches
Israeli Basketball Premier League players
Israeli men's basketball players
Point guards